Mandeali is a language spoken in northern India, predominantly in the Mandi district of Himachal Pradesh by the people of the Mandi Valley and particularly in the major city of Mandi. Other spellings for the name are Mandiyali and Mandiali. UNESCO reports it is one of the highly endangered languages of India. Speakers of the dialect have decreased by 21% from 1961 to 2001.

The language is closely related to Kangri. The Chambealic varieties are often considered separate languages, but at least some are 90–95% intelligible with Mandeali proper.

Dialects
Preliminary survey suggests speakers have functional intelligibility of Kangri. People in southeast Mandi district may have more difficulty understanding Kangri. Standard Mandeali is spoken throughout the broad valley running north and south from Jogindernagar to Sundarnagar. Mandeali Pahari is spoken north around Barot, east of Uhl River. Intelligible with difficulty to standard Mandeali. May be intermediate variety between Mandeali and Kullui. Southeast district contains transition to Mahasui. In the west, Sarkaghat is also a bit different from standard Mandeali, perhaps forming a transition towards Hamirpur and Bilaspur areas. Lexical similarity: 89% with Palampuri dialect of Kangri, 83% with Chambeali.

Script 
The native script of the language is a variety of Takri.

Status 
The language is commonly called Pahari or Himachali, just like many other neighbouring languages. The language has no official status. According to the United Nations Education, Scientific and Cultural Organisation (UNESCO), the language is of definitely endangered category, i.e. many Mandeali children are not learning Mandeali as their mother tongue anymore.

The demand for the inclusion of 'Pahari (Himachali)' under the Eight Schedule of the Constitution, which is supposed to represent multiple Pahari languages of Himachal Pradesh, had been made in the year 2010 by the state's Vidhan Sabha. There has been no positive progress on this matter since then even when small organisations strive to save the language and demand it. Due to political interest, the language is currently recorded as a dialect of Hindi, even when having a poor mutual intelligibility with it and being close to other Pahari lects such as Kahluri and Kangri.

References

Northern Indo-Aryan languages
Languages of Himachal Pradesh
Mandi, Himachal Pradesh
Endangered languages of India